Ramirez Common School District is a public school district in southern Duval County, Texas (USA).

The district serves the unincorporated communities of Ramirez and Sejita.

Ramirez CSD has one school, Ramirez Elementary, which serves students in grades pre-kindergarten through six. Students in grades seven through twelve attend Benavides Secondary School in nearby Benavides.

In 2009, the school district was rated "recognized" by the Texas Education Agency.

References

External links

School districts in Duval County, Texas